Astrid Uhrenholdt Jacobsen (born 22 January 1987) is a Norwegian cross-country skier and a member of the International Olympic Committee (IOC). She skis with the IL Heming club in Oslo, near Holmenkollen. Her greatest achievement is winning the gold medal in sprint at the 2007 World Championships. On 22 April 2020, she announced her retirement from cross-country skiing in favour of medical studies.

Career

Before 2006/07 season
Prior to the 2006/07 season Jacobsen had competed in five World Cup events, three sprint races and two pursuits. One sprint in Drammen in the 2004/05 season and the rest at the end of the 2005/06 season. Her best result in those races was a 10th place in the freestyle sprint in Changchun, China where she lost in the semi final, having had the third best qualifying time. She also achieved another top twenty finish by finishing 17th in the classic sprint in Drammen (2005/06), after qualifying in 15th position. Jacobsen finished the 2005/06 season in 64th place overall and 35th in the sprint, gaining 40 points.

Astrid Jacobsen has competed in two Junior World Championships, in the 2004/2005 Championships held in Rovaniemi, Finland she won a silver in the sprint, behind fellow countrywoman Kari Vikhagen Gjeitnes, and ahead of Swedish Ida Ingemarsdotter.
Then in the 2005/06 Championships in Kranj, Slovenia Jacobsen won two gold medals. The first in the sprint, ahead of Russian Natalia Matveeva, and Norwegian Celine Brun-Lie., after qualifying in first place. The second gold was in a 5 km classical style race, winning in a time of 13:57.9, 18.4 seconds ahead of Eva Nývltová, and 32.7 seconds ahead of Charlotte Kalla. She also competed in the pursuit two days later, but finished in 35th place, in a time of 31:26.7, 2:14.5 behind winner Kalla.

She also competed in two Scandinavian Cup races (2005/06), a pursuit and a sprint, and became fifth and eighth respectively. Jacobsen has one National Championship medal, a silver, which she won in January 2005. She became third in the qualifying, and lost to Marit Bjørgen, and ahead of Ella Gjømle, who was third.

2006/07 season
Jacobsen has competed in three of the four opening races of the 2006/07 season. In the sprint in Düsseldorf she finished in 25th position. A month later she achieved her highest ever World Cup finish, becoming fourth in the classic sprint, losing to Petra Majdič, Virpi Kuitunen, and Marit Bjørgen in the final. The day after she became 35th in the classic 10 km race, in a time of 30:29.5, 2:28.3 behind winner Kuitunen. Jacobsen currently is in 18th position in the World Cup standings, and 9th in the sprint standings.

Her placements in the world cup were good enough to be selected for the Norwegian sprint team to the World Championships in Sapporo where she won her first international title in the sprint event. She also won bronze medals in the team sprint (with Marit Bjørgen) and the 4 x 5 km.

2007/08 season

After two second places in Kuusamo, Jacobsen retrieved her first world cup in Rybinsk 15 December. by winning a 15 km freestyle. Altogether, Jacobsen had 2 wins and 6 podiums this season, placing her second overall behind Virpi Kuitunen.

2008/09 season
After the 2007/08 season, Jacobsen was struck by injuries as well as loss of motivation. Therefore, she lost the early season. She returned to the world cup at the beginning of Tour de Ski, where she placed tenth in the opening prologue. Unfortunately, she fell ill just before the final race, causing her to give up the Tour. She was absent from the world cup after Tour de Ski as well, choosing training for the World Championship instead of competing. However, the championship ended as a big disappointment for Jacobsen, placing 20, 37, 35 in the three first individual events. Her best performance was a fifth place in team sprint along with junior Ingvild Flugstad Østberg. After these poor performances, Jacobsen chose to leave the championship. She fractured her jaw, elbow and back in a cycling accident in June 2009.

2010 Winter Olympics
At the 2010 Winter Olympics, Jacobsen finished fifth in the team sprint and seventh in the individual sprint event.

2010/11 season
In July 2010 Jacobsen fell and dislocated a shoulder while training on roller skis.  She treated herself immediately to repair the damage and soon recovered.  At the FIS Nordic World Ski Championships 2011 at Holmenkollen in Oslo, Jacobsen was selected for the Team Sprint with her teammate Maiken Caspersen Falla.  The pair took Bronze behind the Swedish and Finnish teams.

2013 season
In 2013 Jacobsen had an early success, gaining second place in the Tour de Ski on 6 January.  She thanked her mother, Dr Britt Uhrenholdt Jacobsen, for suggesting during the previous summer that her daughter might be suffering from a gluten allergy, which tests then proved to be correct.  Jacobsen described this diagnosis as very important for her future career.

Cross-country skiing results
All results are sourced from the International Ski Federation (FIS).

Olympic Games
1 medal — (1 gold)

World Championships
 10 medals – (3 gold, 2 silver, 5 bronze)

World Cup

Season standings

Individual podiums
 6 victories – (4 , 2 )
 43 podiums – (22 , 21 )

Team podiums
 8 victories – (7 ,  1 )
 13 podiums – (10 ,  3 )

References

External links

Official Website 
Eurosport profile

1987 births
Cross-country skiers at the 2010 Winter Olympics
Cross-country skiers at the 2014 Winter Olympics
Cross-country skiers at the 2018 Winter Olympics
Living people
Norwegian female cross-country skiers
Norwegian Christians
Olympic cross-country skiers of Norway
Sportspeople from Trondheim
FIS Nordic World Ski Championships medalists in cross-country skiing
Tour de Ski skiers
Medalists at the 2018 Winter Olympics
Olympic gold medalists for Norway
Olympic medalists in cross-country skiing
International Olympic Committee members